Amvrysseas Football Club is a Greek football club based in Distomo, Boeotia, Greece.

Honors

Domestic

 Boeotia FCA Champions: 2
 2016–17, 2019–20

References

Boeotia
Association football clubs established in 1928
1928 establishments in Greece
Gamma Ethniki clubs